The Parks Mall at Arlington is a shopping mall that opened in 1988 at 3811 South Cooper Street (FM 157) and Interstate 20 in South Arlington, Texas between Fort Worth and Dallas. It went through a renovation in 1996.  It is one of the leading shopping destinations in the Metroplex. The Dallas Morning News calls it "An overcrowded entertainment destination". It is the third-largest mall in Tarrant County behind its competitor, North East Mall. Major anchor stores include Dick's Sporting Goods, Dillard's, J. C. Penney, Macy's, and Nordstrom Rack.

History
The Parks at Arlington was built in 1987 and had a grand opening in 1988, the mall was developed by Homart Development Company and Herring Marathon. The original anchor stores were Dillard's, Mervyns, and Sears. 

In 1989, Dillard’s vertically expanded its store by adding another floor to make a total of three floors.

In 1990, The Parks was expanded and Foley's (now Macy's) was added as the fourth anchor store. Five years later, JCPenney was added as the fifth anchor store. 

It expanded again in 2002 with a new wing featuring Galyan's (now Dick's Sporting Goods) and The Great Indoors. The Great Indoors closed in 2003 and the space was taken over by Steve & Barry's in the mid-2000s.

When Mervyns closed in 2006, it was replaced with several new tenants, including Barnes & Noble, The Cheesecake Factory, and Forever 21.

In 2016, the former Steve and Barry’s got taken over by Round1 Amusement.

On July 11, 2020, it was announced that Sears would be closing as part of a plan to close 28 stores nationwide. Since then, it has reopened in August 2021 as Sears Hometown Inc.

Gallery

See also
 List of shopping malls in Texas

References

External links

General Growth Properties: The Parks At Arlington

Shopping malls in the Dallas–Fort Worth metroplex
Shopping malls established in 1988
Buildings and structures in Arlington, Texas
Brookfield Properties
Tourist attractions in Tarrant County, Texas